Abraham Knox (December 24, 1921 − November 15, 2013) was an American actor with nearly 80 films to his credit. Knox was also a screenwriter, film producer, and novelist. Knox was blacklisted during the McCarthy era, and he subsequently moved to Paris and Rome to find work.  Knox's screenwriter credits, where he adapted approximately 150 Italian and French films into English translations, include the English adaptation of Sergio Leone's The Good, the Bad and the Ugly. As a dialogue director, he coached many non-english speaking actors in performing convincingly in the english language.

Selected filmography as an actor 

 Killer McCoy (1947) - Johnny Martin
 I Walk Alone (1948) - Skinner
 Jungle Patrol (1948) - Lt. Louie Rasti
 The Accused (1949) - Jack Hunter
 Knock on Any Door (1949) - Vito
 City Across the River (1949) - Larry
 Any Number Can Play (1949) - Pete Senta
 White Heat (1949) - Het Kohler (uncredited)
 Angels in Disguise (1949) - Angles Carson
 Outside the Wall (1950) - Latzo
 Western Pacific Agent (1950) - Frank Wicken
 Destination Big House (1950) - Tony Savoni
 Up Front (1951) - Driver
 Criminal Lawyer (1951) - Vincent Cheney
 Saturday's Hero (1951) - Joey Novak
 Vice Squad (1953) - Policeman (uncredited)
 Garden of Eden (1954) - Johnny Patterson
 The Naked Street (1955) - Man in Crowd (uncredited)
 Singing in the Dark (1956) - Harry, handsome tough
 G.I. Blues (1960) - Jeeter
 A View From the Bridge (1962) - Louis
 The Longest Day (1962) - downed US Airman with bandaged eye (uncredited)
 The Victors (1963)
 The 10th Victim (1965) - Chet (uncredited)
 Fantabulous Inc. (1967) - Brüdeneck, German General
 Wild 90 (1968) - Twenty Years
 The Biggest Bundle of Them All (1968) - Joe Ware
 Al di là della legge (1968) - (uncredited)
 Confessions of a Police Captain (1971) - Soothsayer (English version, voice, uncredited)
 High Crime (1973) - Newsman at Party (uncredited)
 Street Law (1974) - Gambino (uncredited)
 How to Kill a Judge (1975) - Police Captain (English version, voice)
 The Con Artists (1976) - Philip Accomplice
 Bobby Deerfield (1977) - Tourist #1
 From Corleone to Brooklyn (1979) - Cop (English version, voice, uncredited)
 The Blue-Eyed Bandit (1980) - De Biase - Dominici's head
 Day of the Cobra (1980) - Raul Papasian
 Inchon (1981) - Adm. Doyle
 1990: The Bronx Warriors (1982) - Vice-President (English version, voice, uncredited)
 Odd Squad (1983) - Requisitions officer (uncredited)
 The Lonely Lady (1983) - Tom Castel
 Murder Rock (1984) - Phil, the agent (English version, voice, uncredited)
 Bolero (1984) - Sleazy Moroccan Guide
 Operation Nam (1986) - Maj. Morris (English version, voice, uncredited)
 Detective School Dropouts (1986) - Bernie (uncredited)
 Stage Fright (1987) - Old Cop
 Eleven Days, Eleven Nights (11 giorni, 11 notti) (1987) - Vecchio polizziotto
 I Love N.Y. (1987) - Charles Mitchell
 Buy & Cell (1987) - Arthur
 Rent-a-Cop (1987) - Frank
 Vampire in Venice (1988) - Priest (uncredited)
 Ghoulies II (1988) - Ray
 Run for Your Life (1988)
 Ghosts Can't Do It (1989) - The Pill Man
 Frankenstein Unbound (1990) - General Reade
 The Godfather Part III (1990) - Marty Parisi
 Miliardi (1991) - Surgeon (uncredited)
 Cemetery Man (1994) - Marshall Straniero
 First Action Hero (1994) - Mob Boss (English version, voice, uncredited)
 Titanic: The Legend Goes On (2000) - Sam (voice) (final film role)

In popular culture 
Filmmaker Quentin Tarantino named his lead character, portrayed by Woody Harrelson, after Knox in the film Natural Born Killers.

Knox's 2004 memoir is titled The Good, the Bad and the Dolce Vita: The Adventures of an Actor in Hollywood, Paris and Rome.

See also 

 Hollywood blacklist

References

External links 

 
 
 
 Knox interview
 Notice of death

1921 births
2013 deaths
American male film actors
20th-century American novelists
American male television actors
Hollywood blacklist
American male screenwriters
American film producers
20th-century American male actors
American male novelists
20th-century American male writers